Central Plateau Conservation Area is an animal and plant conservation area in Tasmania, Australia. It is adjacent to the Walls of Jerusalem National Park.

The Central Plateau of Tasmania is the largest area of high ground in Tasmania. It is bound to the north east by the Great Western Tiers, many hydro electric schemes emanating from rivers that flow to the south - and to the west by Cradle Mountain-Lake St Clair National Park.

Central Plateau is a large rural locality in the local government areas of Central Highlands and Meander Valley in the Central and Launceston regions of Tasmania. The 2016 census has a population of nil for the state suburb of Central Plateau.

Central Plateau is a confirmed suburb/locality.

Location
Central Plateau surrounds the locality of Cramps Bay, on the eastern shore of Great Lake. The western part of the locality contains most of the Central Plateau Conservation Area, while the eastern part contains Great Lake. The localities of Breona, Doctors Point, Brandum, Reynolds Neck, Liawenee and Miena occupy a corridor between the western part and Great Lake.

The conservation area extends beyond the boundaries of the locality, taking in parts of the localities of Blackwood Creek, Brandum, Breona, Bronte Park, Caveside, Derwent Bridge, Doctors Point, Jackeys Marsh, Lake St Clair, Liawenee, Liffey, Little Pine Lagoon, Mayberry, Meander, Mersey Forest, Miena, Mole Creek, Reynolds Neck, Walls of Jerusalem, and Western Creek.

Road infrastructure
The A5 route (Highland Lakes Road) enters from the north and runs through to the south. Route B51 (Poatina Road) runs through from north-east to south-east.

See also 
 Protected areas of Tasmania

References

Further reading
 Cullen, Philip J.(1995) Land degradation on the Central Plateau, Tasmania : the legacy of 170 years of exploitation Hobart, Tas. : Earth Science Section, Parks and Wildlife Service, Dept. of Environment and Land Management.   Occasional paper (Tasmania. Parks and Wildlife Service) ; no. 34.
 McKenny, Helen. (2000) A guide to vegetation management issues in the Central Plateau region, Tasmania Hobart, Tas. Dept. of Primary Industries, Water and Environment, 

Conservation areas of Tasmania
Tourist attractions in Tasmania
Central Highlands (Tasmania)
Wilderness areas of Tasmania
Tasmanian Wilderness World Heritage Area
Localities of Central Highlands Council
Localities of Meander Valley Council
Towns in Tasmania